Untamed is a steel Euro-Fighter roller coaster located at Canobie Lake Park in Salem, New Hampshire.

Layout 
The ride is a Gerstlauer Euro-Fighter, 320+ model. The ride was installed by Ride Entertainment Group, who handles all of Gerstlauer's operations in the Western Hemisphere. After the drop the 8 person cars go through three inversions: a large vertical loop, a cutback and a heartline roll. The ride has a forest and wilderness theme with the supports for the ride made to look like white birch trees (the state tree of New Hampshire) and the track painted dark green. The coaster layout for Untamed is particularly close to two other Euro-Fighter (model 320+) roller coasters: Rage at Adventure Island and Falcon at Duinrell.

Impact 
Untamed is Canobie Lake Park's second currently operating steel roller coaster, bringing the park's total number of coasters to three. There had not been a new roller coaster at Canobie Lake since the Dragon Coaster was added in 1991. Untamed is located near the park's oldest coaster, the Yankee Cannonball, and was built on top of an old field used for functions. Part of the Jackpot Casino was turned into the queue. The old spaceship was also moved to a storage area behind the park to make room for the ride.

Similar rides 
Rage in Adventure Island
Falcon in Duinrell
Mystery Mine in Dollywood
SAW – The Ride in Thorpe Park
SpongeBob SquarePants Rock Bottom Plunge at Nickelodeon Universe

See also
 2011 in amusement parks

References

Steel roller coasters
Roller coasters manufactured by Gerstlauer
Roller coasters in New Hampshire
Buildings and structures in Rockingham County, New Hampshire
Roller coasters introduced in 2011
Salem, New Hampshire